Amanda Polk (born August 2, 1986) is an American rower.

References
 

1986 births
Living people
American female rowers
Sportspeople from Pittsburgh
World Rowing Championships medalists for the United States
Rowers at the 2016 Summer Olympics
Olympic gold medalists for the United States in rowing
Medalists at the 2016 Summer Olympics
21st-century American women